Leech Lake is an unincorporated community in Leech Lake Township, Cass County, Minnesota, United States. It is along State Highway 371 (MN 371) near 100th Street NW, Cass County Road 62. Nearby places include Walker, Laporte, and Steamboat Bay of Leech Lake.

References

Unincorporated communities in Cass County, Minnesota
Unincorporated communities in Minnesota